Ganjali-e Sofla (also Romanized as Ganj‘alī-e Soflá; also known as Ganj‘alī, Baleyn, and Ganj ‘Alīābād-e Soflá) is a village in Boluran Rural District, Darb-e Gonbad District, Kuhdasht County, Lorestan Province, Iran. At the 2006 census, its population was 95, in 19 families.

References 

Towns and villages in Kuhdasht County